Stanly is a surname. Notable people with the surname include:

 Edward Stanly (1810–1872), Whig U.S. congressman
 Fabius Stanly (1815–1882), rear admiral of the U.S. Navy
 John Stanly (politician) (1774–1834), Federalist U.S. congressman
 John Carruthers Stanly (1774–1845), slave owner and free black resident

See also
 Stanly (footballer) (born 1994), Brazilian footballer, full name Stanly Teixeira dos Santos
 Stanly County, North Carolina
 Stanley (disambiguation)
 Stan Lee (disambiguation)